The Rembrandt Group, officially known as Rembrandt Trust (Proprietary) Limited, is a South African tobacco and industrial conglomerate founded by Afrikaner tycoon Dr Anton Rupert who oversaw its eventual transition to the industrial and luxury branded goods sectors. Rembrandt was split into Remgro (an investment company with financial, mining and industrial interests) and Richemont (a Swiss-based luxury goods group).

History
Dr Rupert originally established the tobacco company "Voorbrand" in the 1940s. He soon renamed it Rembrandt Ltd. The first Rembrandt cigarettes were manufactured in an old flour mill in Paarl. Four years later Rupert introduced the world to the first king-sized cigarette filter. It was a wild success and it was on the back of this and a R1,5 million loan from Sanlam that Rembrandt's vast overseas empire was built. In 1968, it incorporated Remgro as an investment holding company with interests in financial, mining and industrial interests. In 1972, Rembrandt's overseas tobacco interests were consolidated into Rothmans International.
In 1988, the Rembrandt group founded the Swiss luxury goods company, Richemont, which in turn acquired Rembrandt's shares in Rothmans. Richemont also owns such luxury brands as Cartier (jewellery); Alfred Dunhill and Sulka (designer clothing); Seeger (leather bags); Piaget, Baume & Mercier and Vacheron Constantin (Swiss watches) and Montblanc (pens). In 1995 Rembrandt and Richemont consolidated their respective tobacco interests into Rothmans International, which was at the time the world's fourth largest cigarette manufacturer. In 1999, Rothmans International was acquired by British American Tobacco.

References 

Richemont brands
Manufacturing companies based in Johannesburg